Caregiver syndrome or caregiver stress is a condition that strongly manifests exhaustion, anger, rage, or guilt resulting from unrelieved caring for a chronically ill patient. This condition is not listed in the United States' Diagnostic and Statistical Manual of Mental Disorders, although the term is often used by many healthcare professionals in that country. The equivalent used in many other countries, the ICD-11, does include the condition.

Over 1 in 5 Americans are providing care to those who are ill, aged, and/or disabled. Over 13 million caregivers provide care for their own children as well. Caregiver syndrome is acute when caring for an individual with behavioral difficulties, such as: fecal incontinence, memory issues, sleep problems, wandering, impulse control problems, executive dysfunction, and/or aggression. Typical symptoms of the caregiver syndrome include fatigue, insomnia and stomach complaints with the most common symptom being depression.

Signs and symptoms
Those who are providing care for a friend or family member with a long-term illness undergo what is known as chronic stress. Caregiving has been shown to affect the immune system. It was found that caregivers to persons with Dementia particularly Frontal temporal patients were more depressed, and they showed lower life satisfaction than the comparison samples. The caregivers also had higher EBV antibody titres and lower percentages of T cells and TH cells. Caregiving has also been shown to have adverse effects on wound repair. Further, these biological vulnerabilities are also evident in younger caregivers, implying that it is not an age and caregiver stress interaction. For example, caregivers of children with developmental disabilities have been found to have lower antibody responses to vaccination compared to age and gender matched non-caregiver controls. Further, a higher level of blood pressure has also been observed in those younger caregivers compared to a control group of parents and this particularly strong for those without social support.

Symptoms include depression, anxiety, and anger. Chronic stress can create medical problems including high blood pressure, diabetes, and a compromised immune system. The impact may reduce the care-giver's life expectancy.  

According to a UK-based study, almost two out of three carers of people with dementia feel lonely. Most of the carers in the study were family members of friends.

Caregiver syndrome affects people at any age. For example, elderly caregivers are at a 63 percent higher risk of mortality than non-caregivers who are in the same age group. This trend may be due to elevated levels of stress hormones circulating throughout the body. These levels are similar to someone with PTSD. Because caregivers have to be so immersed in their roles, with day/night hours, they often have to neglect their own health. They are experiencing high amounts of stress along with grief since the health of their loved one is declining. Since their roles are changing from a partnership or mother/daughter, mother/son, etc. relationship to a caregiver and patient relationship, caregivers are turning to online forums such as the Alzheimer's Association for support. This role change is difficult for many people to make, causing them to experience anger, resentment, and guilt. It is difficult to provide quality care in this state of stress.

The health of caregivers should be monitored in various ways. There are tests for measuring the amount of stress on a caregiver.

Caregivers are at risk for adverse effects on their health, due to emotional distress. Even after caregiving has terminated, these stressors can have long-lasting effects on the caregiver's body due to these immune alterations.

Since caregiving can further erode the caregiver's own health, many studies are being done to assess the risks that a caregiver poses when they assume this job and its effects on their immune functioning, endocrine functioning, risk for depression, poor quality of sleep, long-term changes in stress responses, Cardiovascular diseases, an increased risk of infectious disease, and even death. Resentment from the patient is what may lead to the depression and distress typically seen in caregivers. This anxiety and depression can then lead back into the health of the caregiver.

The World Health Organization's categorisation of health conditions, the ICD-11, has a category of "QF27 Difficulty or need for assistance at home and no other household member able to render care". Its browser and coding tool also associate this condition with the term "caregiver burnout", connecting it to occupational burnout.

Caregiver burnout 

Bodies such as the United States government's Centers for Disease Control and Prevention, the American Diabetes Association, and Diabetes Singapore identify and promote the phenomenon of "diabetes burnout." This relates to the self-care of people with diabetes, particularly those with type-2 diabetes. "Diabetes burnout speaks to the physical and emotional exhaustion that people with diabetes experience when they have to deal with caring for themselves on a day-to-day basis. When you have to do so many things to stay in control then it does take a toll on your emotions... Once they get frustrated, some of them give up and stop (maintaining) a healthy diet, taking their medications regularly, going for exercises and this will result in poor diabetes control."

Causes
Caregiver syndrome is caused by the overwhelming duty of caring for a disabled or chronically ill person. Caregiver stress is caused by an increased stress hormone level for an extended period of time. Caregivers also suffer the grief of a declining loved one, as causing a depressive exhaustive state, deteriorating emotional and mental health. "Double-duty caregivers" are those already working in the healthcare field who feel obligated to also care for their loved ones at home. This over-exhaustion and constant caregiving role can cause an increase in physical and mental health deterioration. It is actually being thought that a part of the stress of being a caregiver is from how they feel about the job. In other words, if a caregiver does not like or want to be a caregiver, they will inflict more stress on themselves by accepting the role. Support from the religious community is directly and negatively associated with anger.

Risks
The American Academy of Geriatric Psychiatrists reports one out of four American families provide care for a family member over the age of 50. By 2030, the U.S. Census Bureau estimates a population of 71 million Americans over 65. In the U.K., over 450,000 dementia patients are cared for at home. Nevertheless, over half of the caregivers (52.6%) indicated that they had some desire to institutionalize their relatives with dementia.

The American Academy of Family Physicians and the National Center on Caregiving both believe all caregivers should be screened for stress and depression and recommend providing caregivers with their own resources to help them cope.

Since family and more often one member most assumes the primary caregiver role, these strains fall upon them. Care for those who are chronically ill is irregular, so there are not many facilities that can provide adequate care. This caregiving role is more commonly assumed by women than men. Since there are some illnesses that create a more intense need for caregiving, the caregiver is responsible for almost every aspect in the patient's life. One of the positive aspects of caregiving for a loved one is that it can improve their quality of life, but when the caregiver is depleted of confidence, the recovery may be fostered.

Parents of children with CHD experience psychological distress such as high levels of caregiver stress, anxiety and depression.

Caregiving for military service members who have experienced a traumatic brain injury or PTSD can be very challenging as well. On April 21, 2010, the U.S. Congress passed what is known as the "Caregivers and Veterans Omnibus Health Services Act of 2010". This act recognizes the importance of caregivers who are caring for Veterans, and established a program of assistance for them with benefits including covering counseling and mental health services under the benefits of Department of Veterans Affairs.

Issues in health care
Since this term, "Caregiver syndrome" is widely used among physicians, but is not mentioned in the Diagnostic and Statistical Manual of Mental Disorders (DSM) or in medical literature, physicians are not always sure how to approach the issues that arise with this syndrome. Therefore, this is not addressed frequently. In a survey given by the American Academy of Family Physicians, they found that fewer than 50 percent of caregivers were asked by their doctors whether or not they were experiencing caregiver stress. If this were listed in the DSM with an official diagnosis, it could possibly stigmatize those who have it. Many believe it would be beneficial for this to receive a clinical name though, so caregivers would be able to receive the appropriate resources they need. This would encourage health care professionals to develop better strategies for treatment of Caregiver Syndrome, as well as requiring health insurance agencies to pay for appropriate treatment. Some ways to improve this syndrome have been agreed upon by experts and include the following suggestions:

Expanding the support system for the caregiver
Finding help in various sources for caregiver tasks
Educating caregivers
Paying caregivers salaries competitive with those paid to professional healthcare providers doing similar tasks, thus allowing them to retire from salaried jobs for companies where management is willfully ignorant of or unsympathetic to their workers' family caregiving burdens
Encouraging the growth of telecommuting jobs that enable caregivers to work at home while caring for their patients
Providing full medical benefits for caregivers and their patients
Providing nursing and medical advice when needed, including home visits
Providing respite services on demand
Providing psychological counseling or psychiatric intervention for stress management
Collecting data documenting savings for the national healthcare system made possible by home caregivers

Although previous studies indicate a negative association between caregivers' anger and health, the potential mechanisms linking this relationship are not yet fully understood.

Prevention

Effective coping strategies such as sleep, exercise and relaxation can help prevent stress. Caregivers fare better when they have active coping skills, such as these coping interventions:
 Mindfulness-based stress reduction
 Writing therapy
 Coping effectiveness training
 Stress management 
 Relaxation training
 Assistive Technology

Nearly 15 million Americans provide care that is unpaid to a person living with Dementia. Alzheimer's disease is the most commonly diagnosed type but research says that caring for a person with Frontal Temporal Dementia is more burdensome on carers. Early onset Dementia has even greater difficulties for carers. In many cases carers are overburdened and not supported and their health suffers. In order to maintain their own well-being, caregivers need to focus on their own needs. They need to take time for their own health, and get the appropriate support that they need such as respite from their care-giving duties. Through training, caregivers can learn how to handle the behaviors that are challenging them, and improve their own communication skills. The most important thing the caregiver can do is keep the person with Alzheimer's safe. Research has shown that caregivers experience lower stress and better health when they learn skills through this caregiving training and participate in support groups. Participating in these groups allows caregivers to care for their family members longer in their homes.

Support
A 2014 Cochrane review found that telephone counseling can reduce symptoms of depression for caregivers and address other important caregiver needs.

Services that may be helpful to caregivers include:

 health services in the home
 companion or chore services
 day care centers for adults
 respite care, time out at nursing homes, or assisted living facilities
 counseling
 legal advice
 money management
 support groups
psychotherapeutic programs
 educational programs

Remotely delivered information for caregivers 
A 2021 Cochrane review found that remotely delivered interventions including support, training and information may reduce the burden for the informal caregiver and improve their depressive symptoms. However, there is no certain evidence that they improve health-related quality of life. The findings are based on moderate certainty evidence from 26 studies.

REACH Program
The Resources for Enhancing Alzheimer's Caregiver Health (REACH) Project was created in 1995. This project was designed to enhance family caregiving for those who were taking care of relatives that have Alzheimer's disease and other related dementia (ADRD). This program includes:
 Support groups
 Behavioral skills training programs
 Family-based systems interventions

This program was designed specifically for people who are caring for a loved one with Alzheimer's Disease or Dementia at home, and makes it possible for those with dementia to live in the own homes longer by addressing these problems of caregiver health that force the caregiver to move their loved ones to assisted-living facilities. If they can manage the challenges that come along with caregiving better, both will benefit from this. Special one-on-one training is provided for the caregiver, as well as counseling. This allows them to be more effective in their caregiving roles. They receive help directly from dementia care specialists who work with the client on an individual basis to find solutions to problems such as:
 Caregiver stress
 Challenging behaviors
 Home safety 
 Depression
 Self care
 Social support

Benefits of caregiving
Caregiving can actually provide a health advantage as well for some caregivers. Caregivers maintained higher physical performance when compared to non-caregivers. They declined less in tasks than the low-intensity caregivers and non-caregivers such as: walking pace, grip strength, and the speed with which they could rise from a chair. Caregivers also did significantly better on memory tasks than did non-caregivers over a 2-year time frame. Caregivers scored at the level of someone 10 years younger than them, although both groups (caregivers vs. non-caregivers) were both in their eighties.

While this role brings with it high costs, high rewards are also there too. This is known as "Caregiver gain". These rewards are emotional, psychological, and spiritual such as:
 Growing confidence in one's ability
 Feelings of personal satisfaction
 Increased family closeness

Women who become caregivers are healthy enough to take on the task, therefore it makes sense that they would be stronger than their non-caregiver counterparts, and remain stronger than them. The demands of caregiving cause caregivers to move around a lot, and stay on their feet. Therefore, exercise can improve both physical health and cognition. The complex thought as required by caregiving can ward off cognitive decline. This includes activities such as: 
 Monitoring medications
 Scheduling
 Financial responsibilities

Other benefits mentioned by caregivers are that it gives their life meaning, and produces pride in their success as a caregiver. They are also able to give back to someone else. It has also been noted that psychological benefit finding can be an important way of dealing with stress. The Perceived Benefits of Caregiving scale includes 11 items with questions such as, "Has caregiving given more meaning to your life?" and "Has caregiving made you feel important?" There was an alpha coefficient of 0.7 for this scale. These benefits of caregiving have been found to be associated with improved caregiver adaptation to those who are caring for someone with dementia, end of life caregiving, and bereavement. A study done with dementia caregivers showed that finding the benefits in caregiving predicted a better response to a caregiver intervention over a time period of 12 months.

See also
 Compassion fatigue
 Occupational burnout

References

Caregiving
Psychological stress